Alexander W. Hicks (born September 4, 1969) is a Canadian former ice hockey player who played in the National Hockey League (NHL) for the Mighty Ducks of Anaheim, Pittsburgh Penguins, San Jose Sharks and the Florida Panthers. He is the son of Wayne Hicks. He is currently an assistant coach for the first Arizona State University NCAA D1 hockey team.

Playing career
Hicks played a total of 258 regular season games, scoring 25 goals and 54 assists for 79 points, collecting 247 penalty minutes. He also played 15 playoff games (11 with the Penguins and 4 with the Panthers) scoring 2 assists and collecting 8 penalty minutes. He spent 6 seasons playing in the Deutsche Eishockey Liga in Germany, playing one season with Eisbären Berlin and the Kölner Haie for five seasons before retiring. He was on the championship DEL team in 2002 with the Haie.

He was a member of the RHI's Buffalo Stampede championship team in 1994.

Personal life 
In 2002, Hicks founded the Alex Hicks Initiative, a non-profit charitable organization that provides, coordinates and distributes gifts and support to ill and underprivileged children in Cologne, Germany. The organization continues to thrive to this day.

Career statistics

Regular season and playoffs

References

External links
 

1969 births
Adirondack Red Wings players
Baltimore Bandits players
Canadian ice hockey left wingers
Eisbären Berlin players
Florida Panthers players
Ice hockey people from Calgary
Kölner Haie players
Las Vegas Thunder players
Living people
Louisville Panthers players
Mighty Ducks of Anaheim players
Pittsburgh Penguins players
Buffalo Stampede players
San Jose Sharks players
Toledo Storm players
Undrafted National Hockey League players
University of Wisconsin–Eau Claire alumni
Canadian expatriate ice hockey players in Germany